Adana Toros BYZ is a volleyball club based in Adana. Club's men's team promoted to the top flight of the Turkish Men's Volleyball League in 2016, in just 5 years after the foundation. The club play their home games at the Menderes Sports Hall and is sponsored by Tatlıcı Köse, Sera Fresh, Bodyline and Anadolu Bal. Jersey colours are blue and navy.

History
Adana Toros was founded in 2011 in Adana, as 'Adana Beyzaspor'. The club promoted to the 3rd League of the Turkish Volleyball immediately, and at the 2013/14 season, the club promoted to the 2nd League. At the mean time, the club got its new name Adana BYZ Algomed. In 2015, the club name has changed to Adana Toros BYZ.

Previous names
Adana Beyzaspor (2011-2014)
Adana BYZ Algomed (2014–2015)
Adana Toros BYZ (2015–present)

Board of directors

Volleyball in 2015/16
Adana Toros started the season with 14 new players, including the Austrian national player Thomas Zass. The team finished the group stage at the top with 23 wins in 25 games, losing only 10 sets in total. At semi-final play-off stage in Ankara, the team won all the three games without losing a set.

Play-off finals are played in Bursa, on April 11–13. After beating Düzce Belediyesi and Gümüşhane Torul, Adana Toros guaranteed to promote to the Turkish Men's Volleyball League.

Current squad
Squad as of April 7, 2016

Technical staff

External links
 Turkish Volleyball 2nd League Group A

Gallery

References

Sport in Adana
Turkish volleyball clubs